The Nashville Teens are a British rock band, formed in Surrey in 1962. They are best known for their 1964 hit single "Tobacco Road", a Top 10 hit in the United Kingdom and a Top 20 hit in the United States.

Early membership
Art Sharp (born Arthur Sharp, 26 May 1941, Woking, Surrey) began his career in music as manager of Aerco Records in Woking, Surrey. The group's line-up eventually comprised singers Sharp and Ray Phillips (born Ramon John Philips, 16 January 1939, Tiger Bay, Cardiff, South Wales), with former Cruisers Rock Combo members John Hawken (piano), Mick Dunford (lead guitar) (born Michael Dunford, 8 July 1944, Addlestone, Surrey died 20 November 2012, Surrey), Pete Shannon (born Peter Shannon Harris, 23 September 1941, Antrim, County Antrim, Northern Ireland) (bass) and Dave Maine (drums). Roger Groome replaced Maine shortly afterward, but was in turn replaced by Barry Jenkins in 1963, which is the year a third vocalist, Terry Crowe (born Terence Crowe, 1941, Woking, Surrey) joined briefly and Dunford left, to be replaced by John Allen (born John Samuel Allen, 23 April 1945, St Albans, Hertfordshire). Crowe and Dunford formed "The Plebs" with Danny McCulloch and Derek (Degs) Sirmon and were re-united with Hawken in Renaissance in 1970). There was also another member, Derek Gentle (vocals), who was diagnosed with cancer in the summer of 1962 and had to leave the band. He died in June 1963.

Career
While playing in Hamburg, the Teens backed Jerry Lee Lewis for his Live at the Star Club, Hamburg album.

The band later backed Carl Perkins on his hit single "Big Bad Blues" (May 1964) and also played with Chuck Berry when he toured Britain. One concert was attended by music producer Mickie Most, who subsequently produced the band's June 1964 debut single, an interpretation of the John D. Loudermilk penned song "Tobacco Road", which reached No. 6 in the UK Singles Chart and No. 14 in the US Billboard Hot 100 chart. The follow-up, another Loudermilk song "Google Eye" reached number 10 in the UK in October 1964. The Nashville Teens' record producers also included Andrew Loog Oldham and Shel Talmy. One of their recordings was the mildly controversial Randy Newman number, "The Biggest Night of Her Life", about a schoolgirl who is "too excited to sleep" because she has promised to lose her virginity on her sixteenth birthday to a boy whom her parents like "because his hair is always neat".

A further three top 50 singles, "Find My Way Back Home" and "This Little Bird", and "The Hard Way" followed in February and May 1965, made a brief appearance the following year but three subsequent records ("I Know How It Feels to Be Loved", "Forbidden Fruit" and "That's My Woman") all failed to chart. Jenkins left in 1966 to join The Animals and was replaced by his predecessor Roger Groome. Reportedly, Ray Phillips got an offer to join Cream in 1966. He declined.

Although musically competent, the group's lack of distinctive personality contributed to its lack of long-term success, as did Decca's poor promotion. (By 1970, Decca's only remaining rock acts were The Rolling Stones and The Moody Blues, both of whom handled their own promotion.) In the late Sixties the group returned to its old craft: backing other artists like Carl Perkins, Chuck Berry and Gene Vincent. In 1971 they released a single, "Ella James", a Roy Wood-penned song originally recorded by The Move, on the Parlophone label, again without success.

Split and re-form
Arthur Sharp left in 1972 to join the band's one-time manager Don Arden, and Trevor Williams joined. Despite Phillips's efforts, the Nashville Teens split in 1973. The band re-formed in 1980, however, with Phillips as the only original member, joined by Peter Agate (guitar), Len Surtees (bass) and Adrian Metcalfe (drums). The band is still working. Phillips joined the British Invasion All-Stars in the 1990s and made three albums with the group, consisting of members of The Yardbirds, The Creation, The Pretty Things, Downliners Sect and other groups. The band did a cover of "Tobacco Road" that still receives airplay on XM Satellite Radio. The current line-up is Phillips, Metcalfe, Colin Pattenden (bass and vocals), Simon Spratley (keyboards and vocals) and Ken Osborn (guitar).

A 1993 EMI label compilation, Best of the Nashville Teens, contained a re-recording of their "Tobacco Road" hit which is the only version available on iTunes.

Dunford died of a cerebral hemorrhage on 20 November 2012 in Surrey, England.

Appearances in films and TV shows
The Nashville Teens appeared in three 1965 films:

Pop Gear, by Frederic Goode – a long series of pop artists play one or two songs; the Beatles play live for an audience, while the Animals, the Honeycombs, Peter and Gordon and Herman's Hermits mime in a studio. The Nashville Teens mime "Tobacco Road" and "Google Eye". In the United States the film was issued with the title as Go Go Mania.
Be My Guest, by Lance Comfort – a family has inherited a hotel in Brighton. Their son works at a local paper and tries to set up a pop group of which one member is played by Steve Marriott. A talent scout scene is a pretext to present a few artists, among them The Nashville Teens who also back Jerry Lee Lewis.
Gonks Go Beat, by Robert Hartford-Davis – set in the distant future. An alien from the planet Gonk comes to Earth to establish peace between the two remaining nations, one of which prefers rock and roll and the other ballads and his task involves listening to the Teens, Lulu and the Graham Bond Organisation.

In 2010 "Tobacco Road" was featured on the 4th-season premiere of Mad Men.

Discography

Albums

Studio albums

Live albums

Compilation albums

EPs

Singles

Members
Current members
Ray Phillips – lead vocals, bass guitar (1962–73; 1980–present)
Ken Osborn – lead guitar (?–present)
Colin Pattenden – bass guitar, lead vocals (?–present)
Simon Spratley – keyboards (?–present)
Adrian Metcalfe – drums (1980–present)

Former members

Arthur Sharp – guitar, lead vocals (1962–72)
Trevor Williams – vocals, bass guitar (1972–73)
Terry Crowe – lead vocals (1963; died)
Mick Dunford – lead guitar (1962–63; died 2012)
John Allen – lead guitar (1963–69)
Len Tuckey – lead guitar (1969–73)
Peter Agate – lead guitar (1980–?)
Pete Shannon Harris – bass guitar, guitar (1962–66)
Neil Korner – bass guitar (1966–69)
Roger Dean – bass guitar (1969–73)
Len Surtees – bass guitar (1980–?)
John Hawken – keyboards (1962–68)
Dave Maine – drums (1962)
Roger Groome – drums (1962–63; 1966–73)
Barry Jenkins – drums (1963–66)

See also
List of 1960s one-hit wonders in the United States
List of Decca Records artists
List of performers on Top of the Pops
British Invasion

References

External links
Nashville Teens web site
[ Nashville Teens biography on AMG]

English rock music groups
Beat groups
British Invasion artists
Musical groups established in 1962
1962 establishments in England